Alive in the House of Saints is a live album by pianist Myra Melford's Trio which was recorded in Germany in 1993 and released on the HatART label. The album was originally released as a single CD in 1993 then as an expanded double CD in 2001 and as two separate volumes in 2017/18

Reception

The Allmusic review by Thom Jurek stated "This live date from 1993 from Myra Melford's piano trio is among her most remarkable recordings. ...

On All About Jazz, John Sharpe observed "While the trio recognizably inhabits the tradition, Melford extends and subverts the genre through her adventurous compositions in a foretaste of what was to come with her bands such as Same River Twice, Be Bread and Snowy Egret. She also distinguishes herself through a notable rhythmic impulse, blues-tinged extemporizations and the capacity to take matters outside. Horner provides a solid foundation, holding down vamps in a way that they don't overstay their welcome, and proposing a pulse-based lyricism when in the spotlight"

Track listing
All compositions by Myra Melford

Part 1:
 "Evening Might Still" – 11:16
 "Now & Now 1" – 6:50 Additional track not on original release
 "Between Now & Then" – 15:54 Additional track not on original release
 "Parts I & II Frank Lloyd Wright Goes West to Rest" – 18:50
Part 2:
 "Breaking Light" – 8:57
 "Some Kind of Blues" – 9:40 Additional track not on original release
 "That the Peace" – 10:44
 "And Silence" – 12:11
 "Now & Now 2" – 6:53 Additional track not on original release
 "Live Jump" – 12:19

Personnel 
Myra Melford – piano
Lindsey Horner – double bass
Reggie Nicholson – drums

References

Hathut Records live albums
Myra Melford live albums
1993 live albums